Holly Seibold is a Virginia politician and educator. She is a Democratic member of the Virginia House of Delegates, following a January 2023 special election to fill Virginia's 35th House of Delegates district, which became vacant following the resignation of Democrat Mark Keam.

Political career
On September 6, 2022, Democrat Mark Keam, who represented the 35th district in the Virginia House of Delegates, resigned to take a position in the Biden administration. Keam's resignation lead to a special election for the seat. Seibold ran for the seat and defeated Karl V. Frisch in the Democratic party's nomination caucus, which was held on November 8, 2022. She won the general election, held on January 10, 2023, defeating Republican candidate Monique Baroudi. She was sworn in on January 11, 2023.

Personal life
Seibold has lived in Vienna, Virginia since 2012.

Electoral history

References

External links

Living people
Virginia Democrats
Schoolteachers from Virginia
21st-century American politicians
21st-century American women politicians
Year of birth missing (living people)